County Line High School is a comprehensive high school in Branch, Arkansas located along the Franklin County and Logan County border. Established in 1950, school supports students in grades 7 through 12 and is administered by the County Line School District.

Academics 
The assumed course of study that students complete is the Smart Core curriculum developed by the Arkansas Department of Education (ADE), which requires students to complete at least 22 units prior to graduation. Students complete regular and career focus courses and exams and may select Advanced Placement (AP) coursework and exams that provide an opportunity to receive college credit.

Extracurricular activities 
The mascot of County Line is the Indian. Commonly donning a head dress, this proud mascot stands as a symbol to all opponents County Line will not back down.

The Indians compete in a variety of sports including baseball, basketball (boys/girls), golf (boys/girls), softball, and track and field administered by the Arkansas Activities Association.

In 2003, John Robert Wyatt, Jr., with 1,136 overall wins, was posthumously inducted into the Arkansas High School Coaches Association Hall of Fame.

 1971 : Class B Boys State Champions
 1991: Class 1A Girls State Basketball Champions
 1996: Class 1A Girls State Basketball Champions

Notable alumni 
 Denny Flynn, bull rider
 Doc Sadler (former staff) - basketball coach and executive who has a 38–7 record as County Line basketball coach
 Gary Stubblefield (1969) - Arkansas state senator from Franklin County since 2013; former member of the Arkansas House of Representatives; dairy farmer in Branch, Arkansas

References

External links

Public high schools in Arkansas
Schools in Franklin County, Arkansas
Educational institutions established in 1950
1950 establishments in Arkansas